Ethmia albolinella is a moth in the family Depressariidae. It is found in south-western China (Sichuan).

References

Moths described in 2010
albolinella